Jazzman Mokhothu highway is the main road entering and leaving the town of Botshabelo near Bloemfontein in the Mangaung Metropolitan Municipality.

Roads in South Africa
Transport in the Free State (province)